Burns Lake is a village in British Columbia, Canada.

Burns Lake may also refer to:

Canada
 Burns Lake Airport, near the village in Canada
 Burns Lake (LD Air) Water Aerodrome, near the village in Canada
 Burns Lake Park, near the village in Canada
 Burns Lake railway station, in the village in Canada
 Ts'il Kaz Koh First Nation, also known as Burns Lake Indian Band, centered on the village in Canada

Other uses
 Burns Lake Site, a historic place in Florida, United States